Macabre (also known as Rumah Dara or Dara) is a 2009 Indonesian slasher film by The Mo Brothers. The film tells the story of a group of friends headed to the airport who meet a woman claiming to have been robbed and needs a ride home, which begins a dark turn of events.

The film is based on 2007 short film Dara.

Plot
Adjie and Astrid, a married couple, are getting ready to travel to Sydney for a new job. They are accompanied by their friends, Alam, Eko, and Jimmy to the airport. On the road, they meet up with Adjie's sister, Ladya, and convince her to go with them. Ladya, who still blames Adjie for their parent's death, declines but later changes her mind. After they drive from Ladya's workplace, they see a confused beautiful woman named Maya on the road. She tells them she has been robbed and is unable to get home. Pitying her, they give Maya a ride home.

The group drives to what seems to be the middle of nowhere, where Maya's house is located. There, they meet Maya's family. Her mother, Dara, has a very young and lovely face with an eerie expression and mysterious body language. Adam, Maya's brother is very gentlemanly. Arman, Dara's eldest son, is grumpy and never speaks. Dara secretly drugs Astrid's drink. After much insistence, the group agrees to stay for dinner. Adjie and Astrid, who is pregnant, go upstairs so Astrid could rest. Unfortunately, the remainder of their friends at the dinner get drugged and knocked out. Arman takes them to a cellar, with Alam still at the dinner table. Alam is seduced by Maya, but rejects her. Out of anger, she slashes him and Adam breaks his arm.

Adjie and Astrid see this and try to escape upstairs, but Adam breaks Adjie's leg. Astrid locks herself in the guest room. Dara tells her that the drug she was given will cause her to go into labor. Astrid finds a small window and sees a car arriving at the house. She calls for help, but the woman from the car is Dara's friend. She is given several coolers of "meat", revealing the motive for the slaughter to come. They are a family of cannibals, who belong to a secret society attempting to gain immortality from it. They regularly search for victims, providing human flesh for the society. Astrid's water breaks, and she gives birth on her own.

Astrid gets out of the room with her newborn son and embraces her husband. Dara sneaks in and takes the baby. She tells the couple they can escape by themselves but if they try to take the infant back, they will all die. Astrid follows Dara as Adjie looks for help.

Down in the cellar, Arman has slaughtered Alam with a chainsaw. Ladya knocks him out and breaks out of the cellar. She sets Eko and Jimmy free. After their escape, the trio re-enter the house in an attempt to save the married couple. Maya, armed with a crossbow, shoots at Eko, hitting his left ear. They run to the forest, with Adam now chasing them. Ladya gets away and goes back to the house. Adam catches Jimmy and snaps his neck, killing him. Eko finds a road, where he is spotted by the light of a car.

Back in the house, Adjie enters a room filled with baby cadavers and sees one baby being preserved. He then finds Astrid dead, having been stabbed in the neck with a large hair pin. Adjie attempts to strangle Dara in revenge but Dara stabs him and strangles him into unconsciousness. Arman captures Ladya and prepares to rape her.

The car Eko saw is revealed to be a police patrol car. They find Eko and arrive at the house. The four police officers search the house; one of them finds a video containing the clip that was seen at the start of the film. Shocked, he accidentally drops a collection of photographs, depicting Adam, Arman, and Maya, strangely dated 1912. A photo of Dara is dated 1889. Upstairs, Arman is stabbed in the eye while raping Ladya. She escapes while Arman screams, tipping off the police. Adam turns off the lights, and the family of cannibals attack the police in the dark. However, the leader gets away and fires his assault rifle at Maya, fatally wounding her. Dara, who has killed the other officers, fights the leader for the gun and shoots him to death. Dara finds the dying Maya and breaks her neck to end her daughter's suffering.

Arman comes out with a wooden stick jammed in his eye. He slashes the throat of one of the officers and they die together. Ladya runs to where Adjie is, and they are attacked by Adam. Eko enters and jabs Adam with a sword. Adjie pours a liquid over his head and uses Ladya's lighter to set Adam on fire. Eko is slashed by Dara with a chainsaw while Ladya and Adjie attack a severely burnt Adam. Together, they decapitate Adam.

Ladya and Adjie take the baby to another part of the house. Ladya takes revenge on Dara, the last cannibal remaining. She finds Eko's body and is attacked by Dara and her chainsaw. Ladya fights her with a sword. Dara slashes Adjie's shoulder. Ladya, using one of the officers' guns, shoots Dara, then strangles her with her necklace. She reunites with Adjie and apologizes to him. Adjie forgives her and dies after he asks Ladya to care of her nephew (his newborn son).

Morning has come as Ladya leaves the house with her nephew. She starts the car, but Dara reappears, still alive, and attacks Ladya. Ladya drives and smashes Dara against a large tree. She then looks at Dara's fallen body and drives away. Dara's bloody hand is seen twitching slightly.

Cast
 Shareefa Daanish as Dara
Julie Estelle as Ladya
 Ario Bayu as Adjie
 Sigi Wimala as Astrid
 Imelda Therinne as Maya
 Arifin Putra as Adam
 Daniel Mananta as Jimmy
 Mike Lucock as Alam
 Dendy Subangil as Eko
 Ruli Lubis as Arman
 Aming as Mecia

Production 
In 2007, Timo Tjahjanto and Kimo Stamboel wrote and directed Dara, their first work as the directing duo The Mo Brothers, which originated the characters featured in Macabre as well as the basic concept used to develop the film's screenplay. Tjahjanto and Stamboel had met a few years prior on the set of Stamboel's directorial debut Bunian in 2004 where Tjahjanto worked as a freelance cameraman.

Julie Estelle at first refused to star in the film, but became interested once she read the script.

Release

The film premiered at the 2009 Bucheon International Fantastic Film Festival, then known as PiFan, in July, followed by a theatrical release in Singapore on October 8, 2009. It struggled to gain attraction in its home country of Indonesia and only received a theatrical release the following year on January 22, 2010 titled Rumah Dara.

Following its festival run in 2009, the film's distribution rights for North America and Europe were picked up by the Paris-based Overlook Entertainment. In 2013, the film was released on VOD platforms as part of the Bloody Disgusting Selects line.

Reception

Box office 
In Indonesia, the film performed poorly during its theatrical run. In 2020, Timo Tjahjanto commented that while the film received positive reviews and has since gained a cult following, it did not perform well financially. Overall, it grossed $190,363.

Critical response 
The film received positive reviews from critics. Anton Bitel of Little White Lies praised the film for "its realist opening" that leads to "multiple orgasm[s] of a horror climax that just keeps delivering again and again and again." Following the film's screening at the 2009 Sitges Film Festival, Shelagh Rowan-Legg of That Shelf wrote that "the directors crank up the tension at just the right pace to keep the adrenaline pumping." Maggie Lee of The Hollywood Reporter also gave the film a positive review, writing that the film "is a splatter film that spills buckets of blood as it doles out ladles of tongue-in-cheek, genre-savvy fun."

Derek Elley of Variety wrote that the film "starts leisurely but delivers in the final reels, thanks to some real shocks amid the ankle-deep blood and an eerie perf by Indonesian actress Shareefa Daanish." Ken W. Hanley, a reviewer for Diabolique, called it "a bizarre, bloody masterpiece of madness."

In a less enthusiastic review, Panos Kotzathanasis of Asian Movie Pulse called the film "a genuine exploitation/splatter/slasher film solely addressing fans of the genre" while noting that it "do[es] a great job in all of its aspects."

Awards and nominations

Sequel
In February 2020, Timo Tjahjanto posted on his Twitter account hinting at a sequel to Macabre. In a podcast with fellow Indonesian filmmaker Joko Anwar in April 2020, Tjahjanto shared that while the movie was a hit on the festival circuit, it was not as successful financially and that he and Stamboel will only do a sequel if they have a story that fits their ideals.

References

External links

Macabre at Shock Till You Drop

2009 horror films
2009 films
Films directed by the Mo Brothers
Indonesian horror films
2000s Indonesian-language films
Films set in Indonesia
Indonesian slasher films
Films shot in Indonesia
Films about cannibalism
2009 directorial debut films